The Fujifilm XQ1 is a digital compact camera announced by Fujifilm on October 18, 2013. The XQ1 is a 2014 iF product design award recipient. Its phase detection sensor gives it fast autofocus considering its class.

References 

XQ1
Live-preview digital cameras
Cameras introduced in 2013